A mizhav or mizhavu (Malayalam: മിഴാവ്) is a big copper drum played as an accompanying percussion instrument in the Koodiyattam and Koothu, performing arts of Kerala. It is played by the Ambalavasi Nambiar community. After 1965, when started a mizhavu repertory in kalamandalam mizhavu break the cast barrier and nowadays anyone can play mizhavu in koodiyattam, nangiar koothu, chakyar koothu, and mizhavu thayambaka.

The drum is played only with hands. The Sanskrit name of nambiar "Pānivāda" ('pāni' means hands and 'vāda' comes from the verb 'vādanam' meaning playing, altogether meaning the one who plays with hands) comes from this reason.

Mizhavu is treated as a "Brahmachaarya" and it is considered as sacred. It is used to accompany the holy ritualistic temple performance of Koodiyattam and Koothu. Only Ambalavasi Nambiar community members are allowed to play it inside temples or Koothambalams still.

See also
 Māni Mādhava Chākyār
 Nātyakalpadrumam
 Chakyar Koothu
 Koodiyattam
 Nambiar (Ambalavasi)
 Chakyar
 Mani Damodara Chakyar
 Kathakali
 Mohiniyattam
 Thulall

References

Further reading
 Nātyakalpadrumam, by Guru Mani Madhava Chakyar, Sangeet Natak Akademi- New Delhi, 1975.

Indian musical instruments
Drums
Asian percussion instruments
Kerala music
Koodiyattam